Francisco Raúl Villalobos Padilla (1 February 1921 – 3 February 2022) was a Mexican prelate of the Roman Catholic Church.

Biography
Villalobos Padilla was born in Guadalajara, and ordained a priest on 2 April 1949. He was appointed auxiliary bishop of the Roman Catholic Diocese of Saltillo on 4 May 1971 as well as Titular bishop of Columnata and consecrated on 4 August 1971. He was appointed bishop of Saltillo on 4 October 1975, retiring from the post on 30 December 1999.

He turned 100 in 2021, and died from COVID-19 in Saltillo, Coahuila, on 3 February 2022, at the age of 101.

External links
Catholic-Hierarchy

Reference

1921 births
2022 deaths
20th-century Roman Catholic bishops in Mexico
Bishops appointed by Pope Paul VI
Men centenarians
Mexican centenarians
People from Guadalajara, Jalisco
Deaths from the COVID-19 pandemic in Mexico